Jacob Alex Castro (born December 18, 1999) is an American soccer player who plays for Seattle Sounders FC of Major League Soccer as a goalkeeper. He joined the club's academy in 2017 and played for their reserve team Seattle Sounders FC 2 the following year. Castro played college soccer with the Washington Huskies and the San Diego State Aztecs from 2019 to 2022. He signed a contract with Seattle Sounders FC in December 2022.

Career

Castro was raised in Spanaway, Washington, and joined the Seattle Sounders FC academy in 2017. He made his debut for USL club Seattle Sounders FC 2 on August 19, 2018, in a 4–1 loss to Portland Timbers 2. Castro made four total appearances for the reserve side.

He played two years of college soccer with the Washington Huskies and started two matches as a freshman in 2019. Castro then transferred to the San Diego State Aztecs in 2021, where he played 17 matches and earned seven shutouts. He was named to the All-Pac-12 First Team during his first year at San Diego State and the Second Team in 2022, where he made 16 appearances.

Castro signed a professional contract with Seattle Sounders FC on December 13, 2022, becoming the club's 21st Homegrown Player.

References

External links

1999 births
Living people
American soccer players
Tacoma Defiance players
Washington Huskies men's soccer players
Association football goalkeepers
Soccer players from Washington (state)
People from Tukwila, Washington
USL Championship players
Homegrown Players (MLS)
San Diego State Aztecs men's soccer players